Lawyers' Association for Human Rights of Nepalese Indigenous Peoples or LAHURNIP is an organization that protects and defends the human rights and fundamental freedoms of indigenous peoples in Nepal.

References

 

Human rights organisations based in Nepal